The Grammy Award for Best Dance/Electronic Recording (formerly known as Best Dance Recording) is an award presented at the Grammy Awards, a ceremony that was established in 1958 and originally called the Gramophone Awards, to recording artists for works containing quality vocal performances in the dance music and/or electronic music genres. Honors in several categories are presented at the ceremony annually by the National Academy of Recording Arts and Sciences of the United States to "honor artistic achievement, technical proficiency and overall excellence in the recording industry, without regard to album sales or chart position".

The award for Best Dance Recording was first presented to Donna Summer and Giorgio Moroder in 1998 for the song "Carry On". In 2003, the Academy moved the category from the "Pop" field into a new "Dance" field, which currently contains the category Best Dance/Electronic Album as well. According to the Academy, the award is designated for solo, duo, group or collaborative performances (vocal or instrumental), and is limited to singles or tracks only.

The award goes to the artist, producer and mixer. The engineer and songwriter can apply for a Winners Certificate.

Skrillex has won the award a record three times, with Justin Timberlake, Diplo and The Chemical Brothers winning twice. Bonobo, The Chemical Brothers and Madonna share the record for the most nominations, with five. Bonobo also holds the record for the most nominations without a win.

History
Though she was not the first to suggest that the genre be recognized officially, Ellyn Harris and her Committee for the Advancement of Dance Music lobbied for more than two years to encourage the National Academy of Recording Arts and Sciences to acknowledge dance music. Some Academy members debated whether dance music, with its heavy use of layering, remixing, "lack of melody or verse", and numerous varieties, was truly considered music. Others were concerned that dance music was not a long-lasting genre, fearing the category would face retirement much like the award for Best Disco Recording, which was presented for one year only at the 22nd Grammy Awards in 1980.

In 1998, Harris' efforts paid off when the Academy first presented the award to Donna Summer and Giorgio Moroder at the 40th Grammy Awards for the song "Carry On". While the Academy had once been quoted as saying that "they considered dance music as something pop artists had created in their most frivolous moments", Ivan Bernstein, executive director of the organization's Florida branch, insisted that an award for excellence in dance music would not exist "if there were concerns about excellence".

Starting from the 64th Annual Grammy Awards in 2022, the category was renamed from Best Dance Recording to Best Dance/Electronic Recording.

Recipients

 Each year is linked to the article about the Grammy Awards held that year.

Artists with multiple wins

3 wins
 Skrillex

2 wins
 Diplo
 Justin Timberlake
 The Chemical Brothers

Artists with multiple nominations

5 nominations
 Bonobo
 The Chemical Brothers
 Madonna

4 nominations
 Daft Punk
 Diplo
 David Guetta
 Kylie Minogue
 Skrillex

3 nominations
 Disclosure
 Gloria Estefan
 Lady Gaga
 Rihanna
 Rüfüs Du Sol

2 nominations
 Above & Beyond
 Avicii
 Basement Jaxx
 Britney Spears
 Calvin Harris
 Cher
 Depeche Mode
 Donna Summer
 Duke Dumont
 Fatboy Slim
 Flume
 Goldfrapp
 Groove Armada
 Kaytranada
 Jennifer Lopez
 Justin Timberlake
 LCD Soundsystem
 Pet Shop Boys
 Robyn
 Swedish House Mafia

See also

 Dance Music Hall of Fame

References

General
  Note: User must select the "Dance" category as the genre under the search feature.
 

Specific

External links

 
1998 establishments in the United States
Awards established in 1998
Dance music awards
Dance Recording